Cheriyachante Kroorakrithyangal is a 1979 Indian Malayalam-language film directed by avant-garde filmmaker John Abraham.

Themes

John Abraham, having deep knowledge in Marxist and Christian traditions, made his third film, Cheriyachente Kroora Krithyangal using Christian and feudal symbols in the backdrop of Kuttanadu, his home land. When he attacked the traditionalists in his earlier film Agraharathil Kazhuthai, in Cheriyachente Kroora Krithyangal, he attacked the feudal system and police atrocities during the feudal period in Kerala.

Awards
John Abraham won a Special Jury Award at the Kerala State Film Awards. Adoor Bhasi won the award for the best actor.

Cast
Adoor Bhasi as  Cheriyachen
Kaviyoor Ponnamma as Eliyamma
Abraham Joseph as Avarachan
Venu as Joykutty
Nedumudi Venu as Priest

Additional details
Also known as The Evil Deeds of Cherian, The Wicked Deeds of Cheriyachan, The Wicked Deeds of Father Cheriyan, Wicked Deeds of Cherian
Black and white
 Filming locations: Kuttanadu, Kerala

References

External links

Cheriyachante Kroora Krithyangal - Cinema Of Malayalam
 John Abraham - Profile in cinemaofmalayalam.net
 John Abraham - Weblokam profile
A tribute to Ritwik Ghatak by John

1970s avant-garde and experimental films
1970s Malayalam-language films
Films directed by John Abraham
Films scored by Johnson
Indian avant-garde and experimental films